Barsby is a surname. The surname derives from the village of Barsby in Leicestershire, England. Notable people with the surname include:

 Corey Barsby (born 1992), Australian cricketer
 Jemma Barsby (born 1995), Australian cricketer
 Tina Barsby (fl. 1980s–2010s), British plant geneticist
 Trevor Barsby (born 1964), Australian cricketer
 Cassie, Kirk, Nick, and Tom Barsby, fictional characters in the 1993-94 Australian TV series Paradise Beach

References 

Surnames of English origin